Kostromskoy Uyezd (Костромской уезд) was one of the subdivisions of the Kostroma Governorate of the Russian Empire. It was situated in the western part of the governorate. Its administrative centre was Kostroma.

Demographics
At the time of the Russian Empire Census of 1897, Kostromskoy Uyezd had a population of 181,053. Of these, 98.8% spoke Russian, 0.3% Tatar, 0.3% Yiddish, 0.3% Polish, 0.1% German, 0.1% Ukrainian and 0.1% Belarusian as their native language.

References

 
Uezds of Kostroma Governorate
Kostroma Governorate